Bailey Brook may refer to:
 Bailey Brook (West Branch French Creek tributary), a stream in Pennsylvania, United States
 Bailey Brook, Nova Scotia, a rural community in Canada